Krasilnikov (feminine form: Krasilnikova), from Krasil'nik, dyer – one who paints the yarn and fabric, is a Russian surname. It may refer to:
 Dmitry Anatolyevich Krasilnikov (born 1979), Russian football player
 Dmitry Krasilnikov (manager), manager for FC Puuma Tallinn
 Evgeni Vitalyevich Krasilnikov (1965–2014), Russian former volleyball player
 Igor Krasilnikov (born 1952), composer for viola
 Ivan Nikolayevich Krasilnikov, ataman of a troop of Cossacks who arrested the Socialist-Revolutionary Directory leader and members in 1918 during the left-wing uprisings against the Bolsheviks
 Nikolai Krasilnikov (architect), architect active with the OSA Group
 Nikolay Nikolayevich Krasilnikov (born 1927), Russian scientist and educator in the fields of image transmission, image compression and human visual system
 Nikolai Aleksandrovich Krasilnikov (1896–1973), Russian microbiologist and soil scientist
 Viacheslav Borisovich Krasilnikov (born 1991), Russian beach volleyball player

Russian-language surnames